Below is the list of members of the 14th Lok Sabha (2004-2009), by state.

Andhra Pradesh
Keys:

Arunachal Pradesh

Keys:

Assam
Keys:

Bihar
Keys:

Chhattisgarh
Keys:

Goa
Keys:

Gujarat
Keys:

Haryana
Keys:

Himachal Pradesh
Keys:

Jammu and Kashmir
Keys:

Jharkhand
Keys:

Karnataka
Keys:

Kerala
Keys:

Madhya Pradesh
Keys:

Maharashtra
Keys:

Manipur

Meghalaya
Keys:

Mizoram

Keys:

Nagaland
Keys:

Orissa
Keys:

Punjab
Keys:

Rajasthan
Keys:

Sikkim
Keys:

Tamil Nadu
Keys:

Tripura
Keys:

Uttar Pradesh
Keys:

Uttarakhand
Keys:

West Bengal
Keys:

Andaman and Nicobar Islands 
Keys:

Chandigarh 
Keys:

Dadra and Nagar Haveli 
Keys:

Daman and Diu
Keys:

National Capital Territory of Delhi
Keys:

Lakshadweep
Keys:

Puducherry 
Keys:

Nominated
Keys:

See also
 List of members of the 13th Lok Sabha 
 List of members of the 15th Lok Sabha

References

External links

 14th Lok Sabha Members by Constituency Lok Sabha website

List
14